Navodaya Medical College (NMC) is a medical college based in Raichur, Karnataka, India.

Established by S. R. Reddy in 2001, NMC  was the first private sector medical college in Raichur. The college started with only the Navodaya Hospital & diagnostic centre in 1996 and later in 2001 with the setting up of Navodaya Medical College (NMC), it became a full-fledged independent Medical college in Raichur.

Navodaya medical college is located at Navodaya Nagar, Mantralayam Road, Raichur-584103.

Undergraduate courses

MBBS 

Annual MBBS intake of students is 150 and the program is recognized by the Medical Council of India. MCI has granted permission to increase intake of 50 seats from the academic year 2012 - 13. This college is affiliated to the Rajiv Gandhi University of Health Sciences which is the government Health University in Karnataka.

Postgraduate courses

MD 

Anaesthesiology, Biochemistry, Community Medicine, Dermatology, Venereology and Leprosy,  General Medicine,  Microbiology, Pediatrics, Pathology, Pharmacology, Physiology,  Radio-diagnosis,

MS 

General Surgery, Obstetrics and Gynaecology, Ophthalmology, Orthopaedics, Otorhinolaryngology, Anatomy

The course is three years (the duration of MD and MS courses is two years for those with a two-year recognized diploma in the same specialty).

PG Diploma 

Pediatrics, Obstetrics and Gynaecology, Anesthesia, Ophthalmology, Orthopaedics, Otorhinolaryngology,

The course is three years (the duration of MD and MS courses is two years for those with a two-year recognized diploma in the same specialty).

References

External links
 

Medical colleges in Karnataka
Education in Raichur
Universities and colleges in Raichur district
Private medical colleges in India
Colleges affiliated to Rajiv Gandhi University of Health Sciences
Educational institutions established in 2001
2001 establishments in Karnataka